Elibeidy Dani Martinez (also spelled Elibeidy Danis Martinez, born May 6, 1997) is a Dominican fashion model. She notably starred in Gucci’s all-black model “Soul Scene” campaign.

Career
Dani debuted as a Burberry exclusive, closing their F/W 2016 show. She has walked for Louis Vuitton, Calvin Klein, Acne Studios, Missoni, Paco Rabanne, Saint Laurent, Brandon Maxwell, Gucci, Sonia Rykiel, Valentino, Missoni, Jil Sander, and Prada.

She has appeared in American Vogue, Vogue Italia, Vogue Japan, and T: The New York Times Style Magazine. Dani has appeared in advertisements for stores including Mango and Zara.

In 2017, Dani was chosen as a “Top Newcomer” by models.com.

Notes

References

Living people
1997 births
Dominican Republic female models
People from San Juan Province (Dominican Republic)
IMG Models models